Jennings is a town in Pawnee County, Oklahoma, United States. The population was 363 at the 2010 census, a 2.7 percent decline from the figure of 373 recorded in 2000.

Geography
Jennings is located at  (36.180666, -96.569623).

Demographics

As of the census of 2000, there were 373 people, 140 households, and 102 families residing in the town. There were 173 housing units at an average density of 311.5 per square mile (119.3/km2). The racial makeup of the town was 84.72% White, 11.80% Native American, 0.27% Pacific Islander, and 3.22% from two or more races. Hispanic or Latino of any race were 0.27% of the population.

There were 140 households, out of which 33.6% had children under the age of 18 living with them, 59.3% were married couples living together, 8.6% had a female householder with no husband present, and 27.1% were non-families. 25.7% of all households were made up of individuals, and 11.4% had someone living alone who was 65 years of age or older. The average household size was 2.66 and the average family size was 3.17.

In the town, the population was spread out, with 27.9% under the age of 18, 8.3% from 18 to 24, 31.4% from 25 to 44, 18.5% from 45 to 64, and 13.9% who were 65 years of age or older. The median age was 35 years. For every 100 females, there were 88.4 males. For every 100 females age 18 and over, there were 85.5 males.

The median income for a household in the town was $31,563, and the median income for a family was $36,250. Males had a median income of $28,295 versus $24,375 for females. The per capita income for the town was $13,071. About 10.6% of families and 15.0% of the population were below the poverty line, including 21.4% of those under age 18 and 8.7% of those age 65 or over.

References

External links
 Encyclopedia of Oklahoma History and Culture - Jennings

Towns in Pawnee County, Oklahoma
Towns in Oklahoma